Fort Smith is a census-designated place (CDP) in Big Horn County, Montana, United States. The population was 161 at the 2010 census. The town is named for the former Fort C.F. Smith.

The Crow name for this town is Annu'ucheepe, “Mouth of the canyon.”

Geography
Fort Smith is located at  (45.307906, -107.927392).

It is located along the Bighorn River where it exits from Bighorn Canyon. Montana Highway 313 ends at Fort Smith and leads northeast  to Hardin and Interstate 90.

According to the Köppen Climate Classification system, Fort Smith has a warm-summer humid continental climate, abbreviated "Dfb" on climate maps.

Demographics

As of the census of 2000, there were 122 people, 51 households, and 31 families residing in the CDP. The population density was 103.6 people per square mile (39.9/km2). There were 143 housing units at an average density of 121.4/sq mi (46.8/km2). The racial makeup of the CDP was 64.75% White, 32.79% Native American, 2.46% from other races. Hispanic or Latino of any race were 4.92% of the population.

There were 51 households, out of which 39.2% had children under the age of 18 living with them, 49.0% were married couples living together, 5.9% had a female householder with no husband present, and 39.2% were non-families. 37.3% of all households were made up of individuals, and 3.9% had someone living alone who was 65 years of age or older. The average household size was 2.39 and the average family size was 3.26.

In the CDP, the population was spread out, with 34.4% under the age of 18, 3.3% from 18 to 24, 34.4% from 25 to 44, 20.5% from 45 to 64, and 7.4% who were 65 years of age or older. The median age was 34 years. For every 100 females, there were 159.6 males. For every 100 females age 18 and over, there were 158.1 males.

The median income for a household in the CDP was $24,250, and the median income for a family was $24,333. Males had a median income of $16,250 versus $12,045 for females. The per capita income for the CDP was $10,692. There were 68.2% of families and 50.0% of the population living below the poverty line, including 55.1% of under eighteens and none of those over 64.

Education
Fort Smith has an elementary school. Hardin High School serves 9th through 12th grade.

References

Census-designated places in Big Horn County, Montana
Census-designated places in Montana